The West Hollywood Library is a public library in West Hollywood, California, U.S.. It is a branch of LA County Library.

Architectural significance
The 33,150-square-foot building was completed in 2011. It was designed by architects Steve Johnson and James Favaro, with murals by Shepard Fairey and Kenny Scharf. It won the City Livability Award from the United States Conference of Mayors in 2012.

Collection
The library collection includes LGBT fiction and non-fiction. It is the meeting place of the Lambda Literary Book Club, an LGBT-themed book club.

There are also books in Spanish and Russian.

References

Libraries in Los Angeles County, California
Buildings and structures in West Hollywood, California
Library buildings completed in 2011
2011 establishments in California